William Chaderton (c.1540 – 11 April 1608) was an English academic and bishop. He also served as Lady Margaret's Professor of Divinity.

He was born in Moston, Lancashire, what is now a part of the city of Manchester. After attending The King's School, Chester, he matriculated at Pembroke College, Cambridge in 1555, and graduated M.A. at Christ's College, Cambridge in 1561.

He was Regius Professor of Divinity at Cambridge in 1569, and President of Queens' College, Cambridge from 1568 to 1579. He was Rector of Holywell, Huntingdonshire in 1570. He was Bishop of Chester from 1579 to 1595. He was then Bishop of Lincoln from 1595 to 1608.

He was also Warden of Manchester College, where he was succeeded by John Dee.

Family
Elizabeth Jocelin (née Brooke), author of The Mothers Legacie, To her Unborne Childe (1624), was his granddaughter. After his granddaughter's parents separated, and her mother returned home, Bishop Chaderton was mainly responsible for her upbringing. Elizabeth's childhood was therefore passed in the house of Bishop Chaderton, who educated her. She was extremely well versed in art, religion and language.

Notes

1540s births
1608 deaths
Bishops of Chester
Bishops of Lincoln
16th-century Church of England bishops
17th-century Church of England bishops
Year of birth uncertain
Presidents of Queens' College, Cambridge
People from Moston, Manchester
16th-century scholars
17th-century scholars
People educated at The King's School, Chester
Alumni of Pembroke College, Cambridge
Alumni of Christ's College, Cambridge
Lady Margaret's Professors of Divinity
Regius Professors of Divinity (University of Cambridge)
1540 births